The Marihuana Tax Act of 1937, was a United States Act that placed a tax on the sale of cannabis. The H.R. 6385 act was drafted by Harry Anslinger and introduced by Rep. Robert L. Doughton of North Carolina, on April 14, 1937. The Seventy-fifth United States Congress held hearings on April 27, 28, 29th, 30th, and May 4, 1937. Upon the congressional hearings confirmation, the H.R. 6385 act was redrafted as H.R. 6906 and introduced with House Report 792. The Act is now commonly referred to, using the modern  spelling, as the 1937 Marijuana Tax Act. This act was overturned in 1969 in Leary v. United States, and was repealed by Congress the next year.

Background
Regulations and restrictions on the sale of Cannabis sativa as a drug began as early as 1906 (see Legal history of cannabis in the United States). The head of the Federal Bureau of Narcotics (FBN), Harry J. Anslinger, alleged, in the 1930s, the FBN had an increase of reports of people using marijuana. He had also, in 1935, support from president Franklin D. Roosevelt for adoption of the Uniform State Narcotic Act, state laws included regulations of cannabis.

The total production of hemp fiber in the United States in 1933 decreased to around 500 tons per year. Cultivation of hemp began to increase in 1934 and 1935, but production remained low compared with other fibers.

Interested parties note the aim of the Act was to reduce the hemp industry through excessive taxation largely as an effort of businessmen Andrew Mellon, Randolph Hearst, and the Du Pont family. The same parties argue that with the invention of the decorticator, hemp was an economical replacement for paper pulp in the newspaper industry. Newspaper magnate William Randolph Hearst realized cheap, sustainable, and easily-grown hemp threatened his extensive timber holdings. Mellon, Secretary of the Treasury and the wealthiest man in the US, invested heavily in the Du Pont family's new synthetic fiber, nylon, to compete with hemp. 1916, United States Department of Agriculture (USDA) chief scientists Jason L. Merrill and Lyster H. Dewey created a paper, USDA Bulletin No. 404 "Hemp Hurds as Paper-Making Material", in which they concluded this paper from the woody inner portion of the hemp stem broken into pieces, the 'hemp hurds', was "favorable in comparison with those used with pulp wood". Dewey and Merrill believed hemp hurds were a sustainable source for paper production. The concentration of cellulose in hemp hurds is generally around 35%.  Manufacture of paper -- on equipment designed to use wood-pulp -- with hemp as a raw material shows hemp lacks the qualities needed to become a major competitor to the traditional paper industry. 2003, 95% of the hemp hurds in the EU were used for animal bedding, almost 5% were used as building material. Spokespersons from DuPont and many fiber manufacturers dispute a link between their promotion of nylon over hemp. They explain that the purpose of developing nylon was to produce a fiber competitive with silk and rayon.

The American Medical Association (AMA) opposed the taxation because the tax was imposed on physicians prescribing cannabis, retail pharmacists selling cannabis, and medical cannabis cultivation/manufacturing. The AMA proposed cannabis instead be added to the Harrison Narcotics Tax Act which would have been more efficient and created less burden on doctors. Dr. William Creighton Woodward, legislative counsel for the AMA, testified on behalf of the AMA. He stated that the claims about marijuana addiction, violence, and overdosage were not supported, and that the law should not burden further investigation into medical use.

After hearings with lawyers from Du Pont Chemicals and the Hearst Newspapers Group, the taxation was passed on the grounds of 'differing' reports and hearings. Anslinger also referred to the International Opium Convention from 1928 included cannabis as a drug not a medicine. All state legislators approved identical 'laws' against improper use of cannabis (for ex. the Uniform State Narcotic Act). By 1951, however, spokespeople from Du Pont, Hearst and others came up with new improved rationalizations, and the Boggs Act superseded the Marihuana Taxation Act of 1937. In August 1954, the Internal Revenue Code of 1954 was enacted, and the Marihuana Taxation Act was included in Subchapter A of Chapter 39 of the 1954 Code.

Operation of the act

Shortly after the 1937 Marihuana Tax Act went into effect on October 1, 1937, the Federal Bureau of Narcotics and Denver City police arrested Moses Baca for possession and Samuel Caldwell for dealing. Baca and Caldwell's arrest made them the first marijuana convictions under U.S. federal law for not paying the marijuana tax.  Judge Foster Symes sentenced Baca to 18 months and Caldwell to four years in Leavenworth Penitentiary for violating the 1937 Marihuana Tax Act.

After the Philippines fell to Japanese forces in 1942, the Department of Agriculture and the US Army urged farmers to grow fiber hemp.  Tax stamps for cultivation of fiber hemp began to be issued to farmers. Without any change in the Marihuana Tax Act,  were cultivated with hemp between 1942 and 1945. The last commercial hemp fields were planted in Wisconsin in 1957.

In 1967, President Johnson's Commission on Law Enforcement and Administration of Justice opined, "The Act raises an insignificant amount of revenue and exposes an insignificant number of marijuana transactions to public view, since only a handful of people are registered under the Act. It has become, in effect, solely a criminal law, imposing sanctions upon persons who sell, acquire, or possess marijuana."

In 1969 in Leary v. United States, part of the Act was ruled to be unconstitutional as a violation of the Fifth Amendment, since a person seeking the tax stamp would have to incriminate him/herself. In response the Congress passed the Controlled Substances Act as Title II of the Comprehensive Drug Abuse Prevention and Control Act of 1970, which repealed the 1937 Act.

Etymology

Although the spelling "marijuana" is common in current use, the spelling used in the Marihuana Taxation Act is "marihuana". "Marihuana" was the spelling used in Federal documents at the time.

In addition, the Marihuana Tax Act of 1937 legitimized the use of the term "marijuana" as a label for hemp and cannabis plants and products in the US and around the world. Prior to 1937, "marijuana" was slang; it was not included in any official dictionaries. The word marijuana is probably of Mexican origin.  Mexico passed prohibition for export to the US in 1925 following the International Opium Convention.  In the years leading up to the taxation act, it was in common use in the United States, "smoked like tobacco", and called "ganjah", or "ganja".

The La Guardia Committee Report
The only authoritative voice that opposed Anslinger's campaign against cannabis was that of New York Mayor, Fiorello La Guardia, who appointed in 1938 a commission of investigation, and in 1944 strongly objected to Anslinger's campaign with the La Guardia Committee.

See also 
Legal history of cannabis in the United States
Hemp for Victory (1942) a United States Department of Agriculture war-time film encouraging farmers to grow hemp suitable for U.S. Navy hawser requirements.
Reefer Madness, propagandistic film of 1936.
La Guardia Committee, the first in depth study into the effects of smoking marijuana.

References

Further reading
The Puzzle of the Social Origins of the Marihuana Tax Act of 1937 John F. Galliher, Allynn Walker Social Problems, Vol. 24, No. 3 (Feb., 1977), pp. 367–376
Samuel R. Caldwell, First Person Jailed for the Marihuana Tax Act of 1937.
William B. McAllister, "Harry Anslinger Saves the World: National Security Imperatives and the 1937 Marihuana Tax Act," The Social History of Alcohol and Drugs 33, no. 1 (Spring 2019): 37-62.

External links 
 Full Text of the Marihuana Tax Act as passed in 1937
 Marijuana Tax Stamps: History of the Marihuana Tax Act with photos of government issued tax stamps
 Full transcripts of the congressional hearings for the Marihuana Tax Act of 1937

 
1937 in American law
1937 in cannabis
1937 in the United States
Cannabis law in the United States
Cannabis law reform in the United States
History of drug control
United States federal controlled substances legislation
United States federal taxation legislation
Cannabis prohibition